The École alsacienne is a co-educational private school located in the 6th arrondissement of Paris.

The school was founded by a group of French Alsatians after the French defeat in the Franco-Prussian War. It then became a model for reforming the school system under the Third Republic, and is still to this day a leading establishment of the French secondary education system.

History 

The school was officially founded in 1874, after three years of functioning, by teachers and Protestant academics from Alsace who came to France after the annexation of Alsace-Lorraine by the German Empire during the Franco-Prussian War.

The new school was an establishment for secondary education based on the model of the Jean Sturm Gymnasium, with the ambition of "producing a type of man who was cultivated, and combines the virtues of the regional soul with the general qualities of the humanist". The two first headmasters of the school, Frédéric Rieder (from 1874 to 1891) and Théodore Beck (from 1891 to 1922), were both pastors and former students of the Jean-Sturm Gymnasium.

Later, the school was headed by Henri Péquignat (1922-1936), Jacques Vallette (1936-1945), Jean Neel (1945-1953), Georges Hacquard (1953-1986), Jean-Pierre Hammel (1986-1988), René Fuchs (1988-2001), Pierre de Panafieu (since 2001).

The school rapidly became one of the testing grounds for public education, known as a "pilot school". Non-religious since 1874, mixed in 1908, it insisted from its inception on the importance of French (rather than Latin) and foreign languages. It opened a gymnasium and science labs in 1881. Audiovisual methods of teaching were introduced in 1963, with the introduction of CCTV.

Running from kindergarten to final year, the École alsacienne is one of the most reputable schools in Paris. Students from the École alsacienne often come from amongst the most privileged sectors of society, due to their selection and admission policies, and its geographic location. However, thanks to its scholarship system and due to the limited price of admission, it has maintained a relative social diversity, with strong attendance from the middle class. The establishment offers relatively few integrated places, as many students stay there throughout their school life. The admissions are mainly made in 6th Form (beginning of middle school), as more than half of the student body is admitted at this time. The school considered opening an establishment in Argenteuil, but the project never took place, due to lack of public investment.

Teaching

General 

The school uses active methods of teaching. Therefore, the growth of the child is placed at the heart of the education system, even to the detriment of spaces. Teaching of sport, plastic arts, and music is central, including in the creation of a classe à horaires aménagés musique in the college.

In order to empower students and their families, the school practices education without punishment or reward.

Languages take an important role in the education. German is taught in the first years in the school, but Chinese has been taught since 1963. English courses are obligatory from the beginning of elementary school, and leads to intensive language courses in college and lycée, particularly in the European (specifically English) and Oriental (particularly Chinese) sections.

Since the 2000s, the Ecole alsacienne has offered exchange programs with some partner schools which includes Beijing Jingshan School, Sydney Grammar School, Theresianum Akademie, Daly College, St. Paul's School (New Hampshire), Maru A Pula School, Hotchkiss School, The Dalton School, Lakefield College School, Ashbury College.

Cost 

As the establishment is a private school, education is paid for 912 euros per trimester; there are also scholarships. Entrance is selective: in 2014, there were 300 applications for entry to the 6th Form, for 60 places.

Languages studied 
 German (LV1 until 6th form)
 English (from primary, LV1 until 6th form with a class reserved for bilingual students by level, European section from the 4th year.)
 Chinese (LV2 until 6th form, LV3 from second, Oriental section from the 4th year)
 Spanish (LV2 from the 5th year, LV3 from the second)
 Ancient Greek (option from the second)
 Italian (LV2 from the 5th year)
 Latin (obligatory from the 5th year, optional from the 4th)
 Russian (LV3 from the 4th year)

Lycée ranking 

In 2015, the lycée was ranked 12th of 109 at departmental level in terms of teaching quality, and 130th at national level. The ranking was based on three criteria: baccalauréat results, the proportion of students who obtain their baccalauréat having studied at the school for their last two years, and "added value" (calculated based on the social origin of students, their age, and their diploma results).
The Ecole alsacienne is ranked 7th in Paris, and 11th nationwide for 2020.

Location 

The school is found at 109, rue Notre-Dame-des-Champs in Paris, in the 6th arrondissement of Paris (between the Petit Collège and the Premières/Terminales at 128, rue d’Assas), not far from the Port-Royal and the Jardin du Luxembourg.

Notable former pupils

A 

 
 Catherine Allégret
 Jean Claude Ameisen
 Gabriel Attal
 Axel Auriant
 Jean-Christophe Averty

B 

 Élisabeth Badinter
 Édouard Baer
 Nathalie Baye
 Pierre Bellemare
 Jean-Paul Belmondo
 Pervenche Berès
 Nicolas Berggruen
 Adrien Bertrand
 Raphaële Billetdoux
 
 Marc Boegner
 Jean de Boishue
 Alain Bombard
 Michel Boujenah
 Emmanuel Bove
 Juan Branco
 Thierry Breton
 Jean de Brunhoff
 Denis Buican
 Michel Butel
 Agnès Buzyn

C 

 
 Benjamin Castaldi
 Jean-Baptiste Charcot

D 

 Thomas Dutronc

E 

 Luce Eekman
 Isabelle Eschenbrenner

F 

 Delphine Forest
 Pascal Vitali Fua

G 

 Laurent Gaudé
 André Gide
 Stanislas Guerini
 Boris Guimpel

H 

 Laurens Hammond
 Marina Hands
 Natacha Henry
 Christian Herter
 Stéphane Hessel
 Izïa Higelin

I 

 Marc Iselin
 Jacques Isorni

J 

 Jacques Ehrmann (homme d'affaires)
 Alexandre Jardin
 Joyce Jonathan
 Jul (auteur)

K 

 Wilfrid Kilian

L 

 Jean-Yves Lafesse
 Stéphan Lévy-Kuentz
 Pierre Louÿs
 Daniela Lumbroso

M 

 Horace Mallet
 Elli Medeiros
 Marc Minkowski
 Henry de Monfreid
 Antoine Monis
 Jérôme Monod
 Théodore Monod
 Vincent Moscato

P 

 Jean-Jacques Pauvert
 Gilles Pélisson
 Guillaume Pepy
 Francis Perrin (physicien)
 Michel Piccoli
 Frédéric Pottecher

R 

 François Rachline
 Jean Rosenthal (résistant)
 Patrick de Rousiers
 Emmanuel Roman

S 

 Arthur Sadoun
 Léa Salamé
 Claude Sarraute
 Joël Schmidt
 Colombe Schneck
 Georges Scott
 Michel Seydoux
 Benjamin Siksou
 Sacha Sperling

V 

 Marion Van Renterghem
 Jean Veil
 Pierre-François Veil
 Vercors (écrivain)
 Louis-Charles Viossat

W 

 Paul Wenz
 Sonia Wieder-Atherton

Z 

 Marie-Cécile Zinsou

Gallery

Bibliography 
 Jacques Allier, « Les origines de l’École alsacienne », Bulletin de la Société de l'histoire du protestantisme, 1975, . .
 Sylvia Avrand-Margot, « Musique à l'école : éducation musicale à l'école alsacienne (Paris) », in La Lettre du musicien, 1998, 
 Théodore Beck, Mes souvenirs 1890-1922, Paris, Fischbacher, 1934, 220 p.
 Cinquantenaire de l'École alsacienne, Paris, s.d. (1924), 258 p.
 École alsacienne : Paris : inauguration des nouveaux bâtiments : discours (9 juin 1881), Cerf, Paris, 1881, 27 p.
 « L'École alsacienne », les Saisons d'Alsace, 1994
 Georges Hacquard, Histoire d'une institution française : l'École alsacienne,
 tome 1 : « Naissance d'une école libre 1871-1891 », Paris, Garnier, 1982, 356 p.
 tome 2 : « L'école de la légende 1891-1922 », preface by Jean Bruller, Paris, Suger, 1987, 528 p.
 tome 3 : « La tradition à l'épreuve 1922-1953 », 352 p.
 tome 4 : « L'école du contrat 1953-1986 », 378 p.
 Gabriel Monod, Les réformes de l'enseignement secondaire et l'École alsacienne, Paris, 1886
 Maurice Testard, Une belle école. Histoire anecdotique préfilmée de l'École alsacienne, préface by Vercors, Paris, Vigot frères, 1950, 121 p.

Notes and reference

See also 

 Jean Sturm Gymnasium, private Protestant school in Strasbourg

External links 
 
 Site de l'Association des anciens élèves de l'École alsacienne

 
6th arrondissement of Paris